The Fighting Illini Sports Network are radio stations in Illinois that broadcast Illinois Fighting Illini athletic events. The current, 34 radio station network is managed by Fighting Illini Sports Properties, whose offices are located in Champaign, Illinois.

Current radio affiliates

Personalities
Brian Barnhart, football and men's basketball play-by-play
Martin O'Donnell, football color analyst 
Deon Thomas, men's basketball color analyst

External links
FightingIllini.com

References

Illinois Fighting Illini
Sports radio networks in the United States
Learfield IMG College sports radio networks